Dimitrios Stergios Lalas or Lallas was a significant Greek composer and musician.

Biography 
Lalas was born in 1844 or 1848 in Magarevo, then Ottoman Empire (now North Macedonia). He studied in Monastir, Thessaloniki, Athens and later in 1868-70 in the University of Music and Performing Arts Munich. In 1870 he appears to have met the great German composer Richard Wagner and by 1876 he was his student and collaborator.

He soon became the conductor of an Orchestra in Salzburg, while in Presburg he replaced the conductor Hans Richter at a concert of Wagner's works in the presence of Wagner himself. During 1877-1881 he taught music in Chalki, and later settled in Thessaloniki. He was the teacher of Emilios Riadis.

He cooperated with fellow Greek Macedonians, with whom he co-founded "Macedonian Defense" at the end of 1902, committees of which appeared in Greek Macedonian towns and villages, preparing its inhabitants for the upcoming Macedonian Struggle. At some point, before 1906, Lalas composed a musical work on the Macedonian Struggle, entitled "Makedonikos Paian" (Μακεδονικός Παιάν).

He died of cholera in 1911 in Monastir, and his works were lost in 1917.

References 

Year of birth uncertain
1911 deaths
People from Bitola Municipality
Greek classical composers
Greek nationalists
19th-century Greek musicians
Greek people of the Macedonian Struggle
Greek Macedonians
University of Music and Performing Arts Munich alumni
Greek expatriates in Australia
1840s births
Greek expatriates in Germany
Greek expatriates in Slovakia
Greek expatriates in Turkey
Deaths from cholera